Franck Vandecasteele (born 7 November 1967) is a French former professional footballer who played as a forward.

Career 
Vandecasteele is a product of the Paris Saint-Germain Academy. On 28 May 1985, he played his first and only game for the senior team, a 6–1 league loss to Nancy. After loan spells with Alès and Abbeville, Vandecasteele joined Laval, where he had the period with the most appearances as a footballer.

Vandecasteele continued his career; he went on to play for Bastia, Nice, Sochaux, and Stade Bordelais before retiring in 2003.

After football 
After retiring from football, Vandecasteele was hired by Peugeot. He worked in the Gironde department of France, where the city of Bordeaux is located.

Career statistics

Honours 
Bastia

 Coupe de la Ligue runner-up:

References

External links 
 

Living people
1967 births
People from Rueil-Malmaison
Association football forwards
French footballers
Paris Saint-Germain F.C. players
Olympique Alès players
SC Abbeville players
Stade Lavallois players
SC Bastia players
OGC Nice players
FC Sochaux-Montbéliard players
Stade Bordelais (football) players
Ligue 1 players
Ligue 2 players
French Division 3 (1971–1993) players
Championnat National 3 players